The 1905 U.S. Open was the 11th U.S. Open, held September 21–22 at Myopia Hunt Club in South Hamilton, Massachusetts, northeast of Boston. Willie Anderson won his third consecutive U.S. Open title, and his record fourth overall, two strokes ahead of runner-up Alex Smith.

Smith was the co-leader with Stewart Gardner at 156 after the first 36 holes on Thursday. Following the third round on Friday morning, Smith led Anderson by a shot, but a third consecutive 80 in the afternoon dropped him to second place. Five strokes back after the second round, Anderson closed with 76 and 77 for 314, two strokes ahead of Smith. Scoring conditions at Myopia were very difficult; the lowest score posted was 75, by 1897 champion Joe Lloyd in the opening round. His next best was 83 in the third round.

Anderson's feat of three consecutive U.S. Open titles remains unmatched, while his four wins were later equaled by three others: Bobby Jones, Ben Hogan, and Jack Nicklaus. Anderson played in the next five editions with three top-five finishes and was eleventh in his last appearance in 1910; he died four months later at age 31.

Past champions in the field 

Source:

Did not play: Harry Vardon (1900), Fred Herd (1898), James Foulis (1896).

Round summaries

First round
Thursday, September 22, 1905 (morning)

Source:

Second round
Thursday, September 22, 1905 (afternoon)

Source:

Third round
Friday, September 22, 1905 (morning)

Source:

Final round
Friday, September 22, 1905 (afternoon)

Source:

Amateurs: Lockwood (325), Travis (325).

References

External links
USGA Championship Database

U.S. Open (golf)
U.S. Open (golf)
U.S. Open
Golf in Massachusetts
Hamilton, Massachusetts
Events in Essex County, Massachusetts
U.S. Open (golf)
Sports competitions in Massachusetts
Sports in Essex County, Massachusetts
Tourist attractions in Essex County, Massachusetts
U.S. Open (golf)